Burton Christopher de Wett (born 25 December 1980) is a South African professional cricketer. He is a left-handed batsman, and also bowls leg break. He currently plays first-class cricket for the South Western Districts cricket team.

For the 2010 season, de Wett was the professional for Nelson Cricket Club in the Lancashire League.

References

1980 births
Living people
Cricketers from East London, Eastern Cape
South African cricketers
North West cricketers
Border cricketers
Warriors cricketers
South Western Districts cricketers